Henry Disbrow Phillips (January 16, 1882 – June 29, 1955) was an American Episcopal bishop (1938–1955) and college American football player and coach (1900–1909).  Sportswriter Fuzzy Woodruff called him "the greatest football player who ever sank cleated shoes into a chalk line south of the Mason-Dixon line."

College football

Sewanee

Playing career
Phillips was twice selected All-Southern as a guard and captain of the 1902 Sewanee Tigers football team. On the dedication of Harris Stadium, one writer noted "The University of the South has numbered among its athletes some of the greatest. Anyone who played against giant Henry Phillips in 1901-1903 felt that he was nothing less than the best as guard and fullback." A description of his play by John de Saulles included "His weakness has always, and only, been that of Southern players generally – defense." Phillips was elected to the College Football Hall of Fame in 1959 and is a member of the Sewanee Athletics Hall of Fame. He was nominated though not selected for an Associated Press All-Time Southeast 1869-1919 era team.

Coaching career
He played Sewanee football for six seasons, and then spent two as a line coach.  The two as line coach included an SIAA championship in 1909. He assisted his alma mater from 1909–1911; and 1914–1915.

SIAA
He was also president of the Southern Intercollegiate Athletic Association (SIAA) from 1919 to 1922.

Bishop
After graduating from Sewanee Phillips was ordained in the Episcopal Church. He was ordained deacon in 1906 and priest in 1907. He then served as minister-in-charge of St Mark's Church in LaGrange, Georgia and warden of the LaGrange Settlement till 1915. Between 1915 and 1922 he served as chaplain at the University of South, professor of English Bible and rector of Otey Memorial Parish in Sewanee, Tennessee. In 1922 he became rector of Trinity Church in Columbia, South Carolina, a post he retained till 1938.

In 1938 he was elected Bishop of Southwestern Virginia and was consecrated on September 27, 1938, by Presiding Bishop Henry St. George Tucker. He retired on March 24, 1954, 15 months before his death.

References

1882 births
1955 deaths
American football guards
Sewanee Tigers football coaches
Sewanee Tigers football players
All-Southern college football players
College Football Hall of Fame inductees
Players of American football from Atlanta
Players of American football from Philadelphia
Clergy from Philadelphia
20th-century American Episcopalians
Episcopal bishops of Southwestern Virginia
Sportspeople from Philadelphia